West Heath School is an independent school in Sevenoaks, Kent. It caters for children for whom mainstream schooling has become insufficient, for varying reasons. The school's motto is "Rebuilding Lives Through Education."

The building formerly housed West Heath Girls' School,  a girls' school with around 100 boarding pupils, established in 1865 and closed in 1997.

History and grounds

The school occupies premises formerly occupied by West Heath Girls' School, a private school founded in London in 1865, and which moved to this site, the 18th-century Ashgrove House, in 1932. The former mansion house is grade II listed. Pupils included (from 1974 to 1977) Diana Spencer, the future Princess of Wales. In the 1990s the school began to experience financial difficulties owing to falling pupil numbers, and it was placed into receivership in 1997.

The Diana, Princess of Wales Memorial Fund considered buying the school, but decided against it, and Mohamed Al Fayed stepped in to buy West Heath for £2,300,000 on 20 May 1998 as new premises for the Beth Marie Centre. He later pledged to contribute a further £550,000 towards equipping the school. In a statement, he said:

I am surprised that the Princess Diana Memorial Fund, with all its millions in the bank, did not show a greater interest in this project. I believe it to be a far more fitting tribute to her work than putting her name on tasteless souvenirs.

The school was founded in its current form, as The New School at West Heath, with Valerie May as Principal, on 14 September 1998. At the start it had around 30 pupils. Boarding began in the year 2000, and there are six boarding houses, each named after one of the trustees (see "Management", below); Tarrant, Sissons, Astor, Ruth, Hunniford and Esther.

An additional, more modern, teaching block was built to increase the classroom capacity and overall space for the school.

The entertainer and singer Madonna, who visited the school in 2010, has funded the educational progression through it of one pupil (who has been kept anonymous).

The school was renamed as West Heath School in September 2015.

Management 
Founding patron: Mohamed Al-Fayed

The school is governed by a board of 10 Trustees

School management:
 Principal: Photini Bohacek
 Head of Education (school): Rob Walton 
 Head of Boarding:  Tracey Goodland 
 Head of Post-16 (school support at colleges): Rhiannon Easton

General information
Policy, syllabuses, schemes of work and National Curriculum documents can be made available on request to the Head of Education.
 Criteria for pupils: 11 to 19 years old, female or male.
Disabilities which pupils may have include: acute stress disorder, addiction, affective spectrum, agoraphobia, anorexia nervosa, attention-deficit hyperactivity disorder (ADHD/ADD), autism spectrum/high functioning autism, avoidant personality disorder, bipolar disorder, bulimia nervosa, conduct disorder, developmental delay, clinical depression, dyslexia, developmental coordination disorder, epilepsy, exhibitionism, genetic disorders, hysteria, nervous breakdown, obsessive-compulsive disorder (OCD), obsessive-compulsive personality disorder (OCPD), oppositional defiant disorder, (ODD), general anxiety disorder (GAD), impulse control disorder (kleptomania, intermittent explosive disorder, pyromania, pathological gambling, trichotillomania), emotional or behavioural difficulties, pathological demand avoidance (PDA), panic attacks, pervasive developmental disorder (PDD), seasonal affective disorder (SAD), self-harm (SH), separation anxiety disorder/school refusal, selective mutism, semantic pragmatic disorder, social anxiety (social phobia), Tourette syndrome, Transgender and other various mental health problems.

Many of the disadvantaged pupils have not had the opportunity to get a formal Statement of Special Needs (SSEN) for various reasons.
 Costs – £15,790 p/a (per annum) for day pupils, £42,972 p/a for residential (boarding) pupils.
 Class size – 10 maximum.
 Funding – The school does not have state school status; however it is indirectly funded through the Local Education Authorities (LEAs) of individual pupils, Social Services, Health authorities, bursary or self-funded. Each pupil has an annual review each year to determine if their needs are being met and what changes if any need to be made in their education. Recently the school had to cut back hard on funding due to a decrease in charity donations. Al-Fayed ceased funding the school.
It received some money from Children in Need in 2004, and teachers and pupils also partook in fund-raising activities for Children in Need as a whole, for example sponsored silences, head shaves, makeup-for-the-day and so on.
 Entry – Entering the school requires a Local Education Authority procedure or Social Services referral, as the school has the status as a Special School.
 Number of pupils – 101

Statistics

2005
GCSE grades:
 Unpublished

2004
GCSE grades:
 Number of pupils aged 15: 20
 Pupils achieving 5 or more GCSE passes (A*–C): 0%
 Pupils failing to achieve at least one entry level qualification: 20%
 Average total GCSE point score per 15-year-old: 121.3 (for comparison, the nearest non-Special Educational Needs school, Sevenoaks School: 498.2)

2003
GCSE grades:
 Number of pupils: 31
 Pupils aged 16 achieving 5 or more GCSE grades A*–G: 89% (unpublished which of this is passes, e.g. A*–C)
 Average total point score per 16-year-old: 23.8 (for comparison, the nearest non-SEN school, Sevenoaks School average: 66.8)
 Pupils with Special Educational Needs: 100%

2002
Key Stage 3 tests (not GCSE):
 % pupils achieving level 5 or above in English test: 0%
 % pupils achieving level 5 or above in Maths test: 22%
 % pupils achieving level 5 or above in Science test: 0%
 % 15-year-olds achieving 5 or more grades A*–C: 4%
 1998–2002 decrease in % of 15-year-olds getting 5 or more A*–C: 17%
 % 15-year-olds achieving 5 or more grades D–G: 32%
 % 15-year-olds failing to achieve at least 5 G grades: 64%

2000
GCSE grades:
 Pupils achieving 5 or more GCSE grades A*–C: 33%
 Pupils failing to achieve at least 5 GCSE passes: 67%
 Pupils failing to achieve any GCSE passes: 17%
 Pupils with Special Educational Needs: 100%
 Pupils with SEN with statements: 61.9%
 Pupils with SEN without statements: 38.1%
 Number of pupils: 42

1999
GCSE grades:
 Pupils achieving 5 or more GCSE grades A*–C: 21%
 Pupils failing to achieve at least 5 GCSE passes: 79%
 Pupils failing to achieve any GCSE passes: 11%

Post 16
As well as teaching pupils from Years 7 to 11, the school operates a section allowing pupils to get "support" from the school while going to college; the school itself does not have staff to teach subjects at A-level. Many continue boarding at the school while going to college elsewhere.

Fund a Child's Education (FaCE)
The New School has set up a fundraising drive, FaCE (Fund a Child's Education) to enable it to help children in need of the school to move from its very large waiting list of potential pupils.

References

External links

 The New School at West Heath, Ofsted social care inspection reports
 The New School at West Heath, Ofsted independent school inspection reports
 The New School at West Heath on Independent Schools of the British Isles
 Article mentioning the school on BBC News Online, September 2003
 Information about the school previously on Al-Fayed's website (last available archived version, 17 May 2006)
 West Heath Tennis Centre, which takes place on the schools facilities when not in use for additional funding.

New School at West Heath
New School at West Heath
New School at West Heath
Boarding schools in Kent
Educational institutions established in 1998
Memorials to Diana, Princess of Wales
1998 establishments in England
Schools in Sevenoaks